or  is a traditional hot beverage of Ecuador, made from  (toasted barley flour) and  (unrefined sugar) mixed with spices and combined with liquid, usually milk. The term  may also refer to the dry mix itself.

History

As of 2009, a fourth generation of Madrid's family was still involved in producing  mix.

Despite its relatively recent mid-20th-century origin,  is considered a traditional food.

Ingredients

Some preparations of  may also include quinoa.

Preparation
 is usually prepared using milk or soymilk, but water or fruit juice may also be used. The procedure is similar to that used to make hot chocolate from milk and cocoa powder rather than hot water and a mix.

Other uses
 mix can be used to make fruit smoothies or as an ingredient for custard or other desserts. It is sometimes also eaten with grated cheese, or by itself.

Availability

A number of manufacturers besides the company founded by Rafael Emilio Madrid now produce  mix as well. Several brands are exported to other countries to serve Ecuadoran immigrant populations and other customers.

References

Barley-based drinks
Ecuadorian cuisine
Latin American cuisine
Non-alcoholic drinks